Chandivali is a village in Mulshi taluka of Pune district in the state of Maharashtra, India. Talukas surrounding the village are Karjat, Talegaon Dabhade, Mawal and Khalapur. Districts closest to the village are Raigad, Thane, Mumbai City and Mumbai Suburban.

The nearest railway stations are Vadgaon, Begdewadi, Lonavala, Talegaon and Kamshet.

References

External links
 Villages in Mulshi taluka 
  Villages in Pune Maharashtra
 List of Villages in Mulshi tehsil

Villages in Mulshi taluka